National Highway 60 (NH 60) is a primary national highway in India, connecting Pune and Dhule in the state of Maharashtra. Previously this route was numbered as NH 3 and NH 50. Dhule to Nashik stretch of this route is part of Asian Highway 47.

Route
NH60 connects Dhule, Arvi, Malegaon, Saundane, Chandwad, Ojhar, Nashik, Sinnar, Sangamner, Alephata, Bota, Pimpalwandi, Narayangaon, Peth, Khed, Chakan and Pune in the state of Maharashtra.

Junctions  
 
  Terminal near Dhule.
  near Dhule
  near Malegaon
  near Pimpalgaon Baswant
  near Nashik
  near Sinnar
  near Nandur Shingote
  near Alephata
  near Chakan
  Terminal near Pune.

Asian Highways
Dhule to Nashik stretch of National Highway 60 is part of Asian Highway 47.

See also 
 List of National Highways in India by highway number
 List of National Highways in India by state

References

External links 
 NH 60 on OpenStreetMap

National highways in India
National Highways in Maharashtra